The 2013 Mid-American Football Championship Game was played on December 6, 2013, between the winners of the East division, the Bowling Green Falcons and the winners of the West division, the Northern Illinois Huskies. The Championship game determined the 2013 football champion of the Mid-American Conference (MAC). The winner was to be the Mid-American Conference representative for the 2014 GoDaddy.com Bowl on January 5, 2014, in Mobile, Alabama. Going into the game, Northern Illinois was hoping for an undefeated season and another chance at a BCS game. Bowling Green ended that dream with a 47–27 win.

History

Teams

East Division Champions

West Division Champions

Scoring summary

1st quarter scoring:

2nd quarter scoring:

3rd quarter scoring:

4th quarter scoring:

Statistics

References

Championship Game
MAC Championship Game
Bowling Green Falcons football games
Northern Illinois Huskies football games
American football competitions in Detroit
December 2013 sports events in the United States
MAC Championship
MAC Championship